A bonding electron is an electron involved in chemical bonding. This can refer to:
Chemical bond, a lasting attraction between atoms, ions or molecules
Covalent bond or molecular bond, a sharing of electron pairs between atoms
Bonding molecular orbital, an attraction between the atomic orbitals of atoms in a molecule

Chemical bonding